Ward Pétré (born 30 January 1997) is a Belgian short track speed skater. He competed in the 2018 Winter Olympics.

References

1997 births
Living people
Belgian male short track speed skaters
Olympic short track speed skaters of Belgium
Short track speed skaters at the 2018 Winter Olympics